Ratnagiri Fort may refer to either of these forts in India:

 Ratnagiri Fort, Maharashtra, a coastal fort in Ratnagiri district, also known as Ratnadurg
 Ratnagiri Fort, Andhra Pradesh, a hill fort in Sri Sathya Sai district